John E. Firth (May 6, 1855 – June 23, 1902) was a professional baseball pitcher in the American Association for the 1884 Richmond Virginians.

External links

1855 births
1902 deaths
Major League Baseball pitchers
19th-century baseball players
Richmond Virginians players
Brooklyn Grays (Interstate Association) players
Wilmington Blue Hens players
Atlantic City (minor league baseball) players
Williamsport (minor league baseball) players
Danbury Hatters players
Ashland (minor league baseball) players
Baseball players from Massachusetts